This is a list of association football clubs playing in the league of another country i.e. a country other than the one where they are based. Conditions for competing in a "foreign" league, as well as in a continental/confederational competition, are set case-by-case by FIFA, the international association football federation as well as the respective continental confederation and national football associations involved.

Clubs which are located in defunct nations that merged with others, new nations separated from others, or which stopped competing in a nation's league system because their locale was transferred to another nation, are not included in this article.

Great Britain and Ireland 

As a result of the history of football in the United Kingdom, the United Kingdom has four FIFA member countries instead of one. Therefore, clubs that play outside what would be regarded as their 'home country' are included.

England / Scotland 

 →  : English in Scotland

 Berwick Rangers play in the Scottish football league system. They were relegated in the 2018–19 season and play in the Scottish Lowland League as of 2019–20.
 Tweedmouth Rangers joined tier 6 of the Scottish football league system which is the East of Scotland Football League in 2016 from the North Northumberland League.

 →  : Scottish in England

 Gretna played in the English football league system until 2002 when they were elected to the Scottish Football League. They folded in 2008, and their successor club Gretna 2008 continue to play in the Scottish football league system.
 Annan Athletic played in the English football league system from 1952 (when they joined the Carlisle and District League and the Cumberland Football Association) to 1977.

England / Wales 

 →  : English in Wales

All the English clubs that play in the Welsh league are based in Shropshire.
 The New Saints compete in the Cymru Premier, and represent both the Welsh village of Llansantffraid-ym-Mechain and the English town of Oswestry (the two places are 8 miles/13 km apart), since its merger in 2003 with financially troubled Oswestry Town, an English club which played in the Welsh football structure. Since the 2007–08 season, they have played in Oswestry; previously they played in Llansantffraid-ym-Mechain. As regular contenders for the Welsh Premier League title and Welsh Cup, The New Saints have represented Wales in European competitions.
 Newcastle A.F.C. (from Newcastle, Shropshire) play in the Welsh football league system (Mid Wales South League).
 Bucknell F.C. (from Bucknell, Shropshire) played in the Welsh football league system (Mid Wales South League) until the 2014–15 season.
 Trefonen F.C. play in the Welsh football league system (Montgomeryshire League).
 Morda United previously played in the Mid Wales Football League, but moved to the West Midlands (Regional) League (in the English football league system) in 1994. The club returned, but to the Montgomeryshire League since the 2014–15 season until the 2016–17 season.
 Bishop's Castle Town had played in the Montgomeryshire League, but moved to the Shropshire County League (in the English football league system) in 2010. The club returned to the Montgomeryshire League in the 2016–17 season.
 In addition, Station Road, home to Llanymynech F.C., is located on the English side of Llanymynech, whilst Chester FC play at the Deva Stadium situated just across the border in Wales.

Until 1995–96, English teams close to the border were allowed to compete in the Welsh Cup, although they could not represent Wales in the UEFA Cup Winners' Cup if they won.

 →  : Welsh in England

 Cardiff City play in the Championship
 Swansea City play in the Championship
 Newport County play in League Two
 Wrexham A.F.C. play in the National League
 Merthyr Town play in the Southern Football League Premier Division South
 In addition, Chester F.C.'s stadium, Deva Stadium is now located almost entirely in Wales (all of the pitch and stands, only some of the car park is in England). However, the club is still listed as based in England, as the city is also located in England.

Although all the above clubs play in the English football league system and are allowed to compete in the FA Cup, Wrexham A.F.C. and Merthyr Town F.C. are under the jurisdiction of the Football Association of Wales for disciplinary and administration purposes. Swansea City, Cardiff City and Newport County previously had the same governance until an arrangement was made with the English FA for the 2011–12 season onwards which sees Welsh clubs playing in the top four divisions of English football under the governance of the English FA.

Cardiff City (1921–29, 1952–57, 1960–62, 2013–14 and 2018–19) and Swansea City (1981–83 and 2011–18) have played in the top division of English football (currently the Premier League). Cardiff City are also the only non-English side to have won the FA Cup, winning it in 1927 (also winning the Welsh Cup that year, being the only team to win the national cups of different countries in the same season); they again reached the final in 2008, prompting the English FA to change the rules to allow Welsh clubs to represent England in UEFA competitions should they qualify to do so. Swansea City won the 2012–13 Football League Cup, and are the first Wales-based club to qualify for a European competition through a place reserved for the English Football Association.

The following Welsh clubs have also played in the English football league system:

 Bangor City
 Barry Town
 Bridgend Town
 Caernarfon Town
 Colwyn Bay F.C.
 Newtown F.C.
 Ton Pentre F.C.
 Treharris AW

The following defunct Welsh clubs also played in the English league system:

 Aberdare Athletic
 Abertillery Town
 Lovells Athletic
 Mardy A.F.C.
 Merthyr Tydfil F.C.
 Mid Rhondda F.C.
 Mid Rhondda United
 Rhyl F.C.

Until 1995, the above clubs were allowed to participate in the Welsh Cup, and represented Wales in the Cup Winners' Cup if they won. Clubs playing in those parts of England close to the Welsh border could also play in the Welsh Cup by invitation but could not represent Wales if they won, this berth instead went to the best-finishing Welsh team.

Northern Ireland / Republic of Ireland 

 →  : Northern Irish in the Republic of Ireland

 Derry City have played in, and won the league championships and main cup competitions in, both the Northern Ireland football league system and the Republic of Ireland football league system, within which it currently (as of 2021) competes.  Founded in 1928, it played in the Irish Football League until 1972, when it left due to issues related to The Troubles. The club then spent 13 years without a league until being admitted to the second level of the League of Ireland in 1985. It has represented both Northern Ireland and the Republic of Ireland in European club competitions.

Guernsey / England 
 →  : Guernsey in England

 Guernsey F.C. play in the Isthmian League Division One South Central. (Step 4)

The Guernsey Football Association has no international recognition; it has county status within the English Football Association.

Jersey / England 
 →  : Jersey in England

 Jersey Bulls F.C. play in the Combined Counties League Premier Division South. (Step 5)

The Jersey Football Association has no international recognition; it has county status within the English Football Association.

Isle of Man / England 
 →  : Isle of Man in England

 F.C. Isle of Man play in the North West Counties Football League Division One North (Step 6).

The Isle of Man Football Association has no international recognition; it has county status within the English Football Association.

Continental Europe

Andorra / Spain 
 →  : Andorran in Spain

 FC Andorra plays in the Spanish football league system (Segunda División).

Austria / Germany 
 →  : Austrian in Germany

 SV Kleinwalsertal played in Germany from the 1960s until 2018, playing in the tier eleven B-Klasse Allgäu 8 in 2017–18.

Bosnia and Herzegovina / Federal Republic of Yugoslavia 
 →  : Bosnian in Federal Republic of Yugoslavia

 FK Borac Banja Luka played in the Federal Republic of Yugoslavia (Serbia and Montenegro) football league system after the breakup of Yugoslavia, of which all three republics had been part. Technically, the club stayed Yugoslav and continued to participate in Yugoslav competition until 1995, despite Bosnia and Herzegovina having been recognised as independent in 1992.

Cyprus / Greece 
 →  : Cypriot in Greece

 Olympiakos Nicosia played in Greece in 1967–68, 1969–70, and 1971–72.
 AEL Limassol played in Greece in 1968–69.
 EPA Larnaca FC played in Greece in 1970–71.
 AC Omonia played in Greece in 1972–73.
 APOEL F.C. played in Greece in 1973–74.

From 1967 to 1974, the champion of the Cypriot First Division was promoted to the Greek First Division.

Czechoslovakia / Hungary 
 →  : Czechoslovak in Hungary

 SC Rusj Užhorod (1925 – 1945), due to partitioning of Czechoslovakia in 1938–39, Rusj Užhorod was forced to play in Hungarian competitions in 1939 – 1945, and the city is now in Ukraine.

Finland / Sweden 
 →  : Finnish in Sweden

 IF Fram 1999–2011 and possibly earlier
 IF Östernäskamraterna 2004–2007
 Eckerö IF 2005–2009
 Jomala IK 2000–2005 and possibly earlier
 IF Finströms Kamraterna 2002–2003
 IF Start 2004
 Lemlands IF 2011–2021
 Hammarlands IK 2014– still plays in Swedish league system (Division 7, Uppland östra (Tier 9))

All clubs are based in Åland, an autonomous region of Finland with an indigenous ethnic Swedish population.

Georgia / Soviet Union 
 →  : Georgian in the Soviet Union

 FC Dinamo Sukhumi played in the Soviet football league system. Technically, the club stayed Soviet and continued to participate in Soviet competition. Concurrently, in Georgia was conducted separate championship and some former footballers from Dynamo Sukhumi created FC Tskhumi in Tbilisi.

Germany / Switzerland 
 →  : German in Switzerland

 FC Büsingen play in the Swiss Football League system (3. Liga – Group 5), as Büsingen am Hochrhein is a German exclave surrounded by Switzerland.

Italy / Switzerland 
 →  : Italian in Switzerland

 AP Campionese played in the Swiss Football League system until 2020, as Campione d'Italia is an Italian exclave surrounded by Switzerland.

 →  : Swiss in Italy :

 FC Chiasso played in the Italian league system between 1914 and 1923.

Kosovo / Serbia 
 →  : Kosovar in Serbia 
Kosovo is still only a partially recognised state and the government of Serbia still claims the territory as its own. Due to Serbian refusal of Kosovo institutions, Serbs in North Kosovo act independently in sport. For example, the Football First League of North Kosovo was primarily formed of Serbian clubs from four of North Kosovo's municipalities. Both governments agreed upon creating a Community of Serb Municipalities.

In 2016, Kosovo became the 55th member of UEFA, and therefore Football Federation of Kosovo's Football Superleague of Kosovo became a recognised independent league.

From 2010 to 2015, the Football First League of North Kosovo was the top football regional league in North Kosovo, ranked fifth in the Serbian league system. The league was formed primarily of Serbian football clubs that come from four of North Kosovo's municipalities such as Leposavić, Zvečan, Zubin Potok and Northern Kosovska Mitrovica. The league was formed in protest to the establishment of the Kosovo Super League by the Republic of Kosovo; the Serbian clubs from North Kosovo refuse to enter the Republic of Kosovo's institutions as per the Assembly of the Community of Municipalities of the Autonomous Province of Kosovo and Metohija.

 FK Ibar Leposavić
 FK Kopaonik Lešak
 FK Moša Banje
 FK Rudar Kosovska Mitrovica
 FK Zvečan
 FK Radnik Prilužje (until 2013)
 FK Sočanica (until 2014)

There are two other clubs from North Kosovo, which compete in different leagues:

 FK Mokra Gora plays in the national Serbian League West
 FK Trepča play in the Morava Zone League

Latvia / Soviet Union 
 →  : Latvian in the Soviet Union

 FK Pārdaugava, same as the Georgian FC Dynamo Sukhumi, it was one of the few clubs that continued to compete in the Soviet football competitions despite official withdrawal of its domestic football organizations. The club was created in place of the Soviet Daugava club which was a regional branch of the Soviet bigger Dynamo sports society associated with the Soviet KGB and law enforcement.

Liechtenstein / Switzerland 

 →  : Liechtensteiner in Switzerland

 FC Balzers
 USV Eschen/Mauren
 FC Ruggell
 FC Schaan
 FC Triesen
 FC Triesenberg
 FC Vaduz

All clubs in Liechtenstein play in the Swiss Football League system, as Liechtenstein has no properly recognized league of its own. These clubs also compete in the Liechtenstein Football Cup, which is effectively the championship of Liechtenstein, with the winners representing Liechtenstein in the corresponding UEFA club competition (the Cup Winners’ Cup through the 1998–99 season, thereafter the UEFA Cup/UEFA Europa League through the 2020–21 season, and currently the UEFA Europa Conference League). The cup winners are the only club representing Liechtenstein in Europe, as without a league they do not have a club in the UEFA Champions League. Liechtenstein clubs also do not play in the Swiss Cup, and are not eligible for qualification to European competitions via the Swiss league system.

FC Vaduz has had three stints in the top flight in Switzerland: the first in the 2008–09 season, the second running from 2014 to 2017, and the most recent was in 2020–21. They are the only Liechtenstein club to have ever played in the Swiss Super League. In the 2022–23 UEFA Europa Conference League, they qualified for the group stage, becoming the first team from Liechtenstein to play in the group stage of a UEFA club competition.

Monaco / France 
 →  : Monegasque in France

 AS Monaco FC play in the French football league system (Ligue 1 since 2013–2014) as Monaco does not have a professional league and the Monégasque Football Federation, which has no international recognition, was not formed until 2000. They are one of the most successful clubs in France having won eight Ligue 1, five Coupe de France and one Coupe de la Ligue titles, and have also represented France in European competitions, reaching the final of the now-defunct UEFA Cup Winners' Cup in 1992 and of the UEFA Champions League in 2004.

San Marino / Italy 
 →  : Sammarinese in Italy

 San Marino Calcio played in the Italian football league system from its foundation in 1959 until the end of the 2018–19 Serie D season, when they moved to Cattolica in Italy, merging into the local team (though the club was still legally based in San Marino). The club was refunded in 2021 as Victor San Marino, taking part in the fifth level Eccellenza.
 A.C. Juvenes/Dogana played in both the Campionato Sammarinese di Calcio and the Italian amateur levels until the 2006–07 season. Now they play only in the Sammarinese league. Juvenes/Dogana was founded in 2000 after the merger of S.S. Juvenes and G.S. Dogana: the two clubs also played in both Italy and San Marino at the time of the merger.

The home league of San Marino was established only in 1985. Before that year, other Sammarinese teams have competed in the Italian system, though only San Marino Calcio was allowed to take part in the system and also to Coppa Italia exclusively:

 S.P. Cailungo
 F.C. Domagnano
 S.C. Faetano
 F.C. Fiorentino
 S.P. La Fiorita
 S.S. Folgore Falciano Calcio
 A.C. Juvenes/Dogana
 A.C. Libertas
 S.S. Murata
 S.S. Pennarossa
 S.S. San Giovanni
 S.P. Tre Fiori
 S.P. Tre Penne
 S.S. Virtus

Spain / France 
 →  : Spanish in France

 UE Bossòst play in the French football league system (Occitanie League, Haute-Garonne District, D2).

Ukraine / Russia 
 →  : Ukrainian in Russia

 FC SKChF Sevastopol (reconstituted based on FC Sevastopol)
 FC TSK Simferopol (reconstituted based on SC Tavriya Simferopol)
 FC Zhemchuzhina Yalta (revived based on same club that was disqualified from Ukrainian competitions)

The three clubs are from Crimea, a territory recognized by Ukraine and a majority of countries as part of Ukraine, but have been under effective Russian control as the Republic of Crimea since the annexation of Crimea by the Russian Federation. FC Sevastopol and SC Tavriya Simferopol last played in the 2013–14 Ukrainian Premier League, and were dissolved after the completion of the season. The three clubs were reformed as football organizations of the Russian Federation and joined the Russian Professional Football League starting from the 2014–15 season, after approval from the Russian Football Union. The inclusion of Crimean clubs in Russian competitions have not been approved by either FIFA or UEFA, and the Football Federation of Ukraine have lodged a complaint. On 22 August 2014 UEFA decided "that any football matches played by Crimean clubs organised under the auspices of the Russian Football Union will not be recognised by UEFA until further notice", and on 4 December 2014, decided to prohibit Crimean clubs to play in competitions organised by the Russian Football Union as from 1 January 2015 and for the region to be considered as a "special zone" for football purposes until further notice.

Africa

Western Sahara / Morocco 
 →  : Western Saharan in Morocco

 JS Massira, from the city of El Aaiún in the territory that the Sahrawi Arab Democratic Republic claims but does not hold, plays in Botola 2, the second division of the Moroccan Football League.

Americas 

Many North American sports leagues are made up of teams from different countries—three of the four largest professional leagues have teams representing cities on both sides of the U.S.-Canada border. The same is true for soccer leagues. Although foreign clubs can and do participate in leagues based in the United States, no such team is eligible to participate in the U.S. Open Cup, which is only open to teams affiliated with the United States Soccer Federation (U.S. Soccer).

Previously, Canadian teams playing in Major League Soccer (MLS) were not eligible to qualify for the CONCACAF Champions League through the MLS regular season or playoffs; their only method of qualification is through the Canadian Championship, the cup competition run by the Canadian Soccer Association. However, starting from the 2023 MLS season, Canadian teams can qualify for the expanded 2024 CONCACAF Champions League through the MLS regular season or playoffs, or through the Leagues Cup, a competition run by MLS and Liga MX.

Those teams that do participate in U.S. leagues also participate in various competitions under their local federations to gain entry into the Champions League and the now defunct CONCACAF League.

Antigua and Barbuda / United States 
 →  : Antiguan and Barbudan in the United States

 Antigua Barracuda FC played in USL Pro (the league now known as the USL Championship) from 2011 to 2013. The team was forced to play its entire 2013 schedule on the road due to issues with its home stadium, normally a cricket ground, and folded after that season.

Bermuda / United States 
 →  : Bermudian in the United States

 Bermuda Hogges, before folding at the end of the 2012 season, played in the Premier Development League (PDL; now known as USL League Two). The team began as a member of the USL Second Division (the effective predecessor to today's USL Championship), but self-relegated to the PDL after the 2009 season. Many of the players appeared for the Bermuda national team. The club folded after the 2013 PDL season.
 FC Bascome Bermuda joined the USL League Two in time for the 2020 season; however, its debut was postponed to 2023 due to the 2020, 2021 and 2022 COVID-19 pandemic and consequent travel restrictions.

Canada / United States 
 →  : Canadian in the United States

 Toronto FC have played in MLS since 2007.
 Vancouver Whitecaps FC joined MLS in 2011. The Whitecaps played in the USL First Division until 2009 and in the temporary USSF Division 2 in 2010.
 CF Montréal joined MLS in 2012 under the name Montreal Impact, which was the same as their predecessors, that had played the previous three seasons in three different US-based leagues: the USL First Division in 2009, the temporary USSF Division 2 in 2010, and the new NASL in 2011.
 Toronto FC II and Whitecaps FC 2 play in MLS Next Pro. They previously played in the USL Championship (both clubs) and USL League One (Toronto FC II).
 Thunder Bay Chill and FC Manitoba (formerly WSA Winnipeg) are teams currently playing in USL League Two.

Former 

Several Canadian clubs played in previous incarnations of the NASL, including:

 Calgary Boomers
 Edmonton Drillers
 Montreal Manic
 Montreal Olympique
 Toronto Blizzard (also known as Toronto Metros and Toronto Metros-Croatia)
 Toronto Falcons
 Vancouver Royals
 Vancouver Whitecaps

Canada's other MLS teams began fielding USL reserve sides in 2015, but both USL sides have since been folded. FC Montreal was folded by the Impact upon the announcement by Ottawa Fury FC that they would join the USL, with the Fury becoming the Impact's top affiliate. The Whitecaps folded Whitecaps FC 2 after the 2017 season in favor of an affiliation with a new USL side, Fresno FC.

The Toronto Lynx (which had played in the USL A-League/First Division until 2006) also participated until 2014 in the Premier Development League (PDL), known since 2019 as USL League Two.  In addition, two Canadian MLS teams, the Impact and Whitecaps, previously fielded under-23 sides in the PDL. Former Canadian PDL/USL2 teams include the Abbotsford Mariners, Hamilton Rage, K–W United FC, FC London, original Ottawa Fury, and Vancouver Whitecaps Residency (replaced by Whitecaps U-23), Toronto FC III, Calgary Foothills FC, TSS FC Rovers, Victoria Highlanders.

FC Edmonton played in the modern North American Soccer League until 2017, at which time it halted professional operations. The club resumed professional play in 2019 on its own side of the US–Canada border in the new Canadian Premier League.

The Ottawa Fury began play in the NASL in 2014, replacing a PDL team of the same name. The team moved to the league now known as the USL Championship after the 2016 season before suspending operations following the 2019 season.

As in the men's game, the women's soccer pyramid contains leagues that operate on both sides of the border. The current top level, the National Women's Soccer League, operates solely in the U.S., although it receives financial backing from both U.S. Soccer and the Canadian Soccer Association, and also had backing from the Mexican Football Federation until that body organized its own women's league in 2017.

 The USL W-League had six Canadian members—K-W United, Laval Comets, London Gryphons, Ottawa Fury Women, Quebec Dynamo, and Toronto Lady Lynx at its height before folding following the 2015 season.
 Calgary Foothills WFC and SASA Impact FC play in United Women's Soccer.

Puerto Rico / United States 
 →  : Puerto Rican in the United States

Even though Puerto Rico is a dependent territory of the United States, it has a separate football federation, the Puerto Rican Football Federation. The highest level of competition within Puerto Rico is the Puerto Rico Soccer League, and teams can qualify domestically as Puerto Rican entrants in the Caribbean Club Championship and the CONCACAF Champions League.

 The Puerto Rico Islanders played in the new North American Soccer League (NASL) during the league's first two seasons of 2011 and 2012. The Islanders had played in the USL First Division in 2009 and USSF D2 Pro League in 2010.
 Sevilla FC Puerto Rico, Club Atlético River Plate Puerto Rico, and Puerto Rico United were initially going to play in USL Pro in the 2011 season, but were removed due to severe economic difficulties. All three teams moved to Puerto Rican leagues.
 Puerto Rico FC, played in the NASL's 2016 fall season and the 2017 season.
 Puerto Rico Capitals, a women's team that played in the Women's Premier Soccer League in 2008, 2009, and 2010.

Asia and Oceania

Australia / Singapore 
 →  : Australian in Singapore

 Perth Kangaroos IFC and the Darwin Cubs played in the 1994 Singapore Premier League, placing first and second, respectively.

Brunei / Malaysia 
 →  : Bruneian in Malaysia

 DPMM FC played in the Malaysia Premier League in 2006, and the Malaysia Super League in 2007 and 2008.
 The Football Association of Brunei Darussalam used to enter a team in the Malaysian league.

Brunei / Singapore 
 →  : Bruneian in Singapore

 DPMM FC play in the Singapore Premier League, starting in 2009, after getting expelled from the Malaysia Super League for the 2009 season (see above). They were also invited to take part in the Singapore Cup in 2007. Only during the FIFA ban on the Brunei FA in 2009, that DPMM FC have suspended their participation and resumed it only in 2012.

China / Hong Kong 
 →  : Mainland Chinese in Hong Kong

While Hong Kong is a special administrative region of China, it has its own football federation (Hong Kong Football Association) and professional league (Hong Kong Premier League).

 Lanwa FC played in the Hong Kong First Division League for three seasons from 2005 to 2008.
 Chengdu Tiancheng and Xiangxue Eisiti were both reserve teams of clubs based in mainland China which played in the 2008–09 Hong Kong First Division League season. However, both teams played their home games in Hong Kong.
 R&F (a satellite team of Guangzhou R&F F.C., a top-level professional club in China's Super League) play in the Hong Kong Premier League, starting from the 2016–17 season. After failing to win a trophy in four years, R&F officially announced withdrawal from the league on 14 October 2020.

Macau / China 
 →  : Macanese in Mainland China

While Macau is a special administrative region of China, it has its own football federation (Macau Football Association) and league (Liga de Elite).

 The Macau Football Association runs MFA Development, fielding under-23 players. Beginning with Season 2018, it could participate in CMCL Regional Competition, but is not eligible for promotion to the Chinese third tier.

Malaysia / Australia 
 → : Malaysian in Australia

 Harimau Muda A competed in National Premier Leagues Queensland in the 2014 season, but played all their games in Australia.

Malaysia / Singapore 
 →  : Malaysian in Singapore

 As part of a two-way arrangement with the Football Association of Singapore, the Football Association of Malaysia entered an under-22 representative side, known as Harimau Muda A, in the S-League from 2012 to 2015 (in 2014 with a B-Team (see above)).

 →  : Singaporean in Malaysia

 The Football Association of Singapore used to enter a team in the Malaysian league, but pulled out after the 1994 season following a dispute with the Football Association of Malaysia over gate receipts, and launched its own S.League. From 2012 to 2015, a new Singapore representative side, based around the Under-23 team participated in the Malaysia Super League and the Malaysia Cup.

New Zealand / Australia 

 →  : New Zealand in Australia

 Wellington Phoenix play in the A-League, starting from the 2007–08 season.
 New Zealand Knights played in the National Soccer League from 1999 to 2004 (as Football Kingz FC) and in the A-League from 2005 to 2007.

As New Zealand is a member of OFC and Australia is a member of AFC since moving from OFC in 2006, Wellington Phoenix are playing in the league of a member of another football confederation. As per agreement with FIFA, AFC and OFC, Wellington Phoenix are not allowed to participate in the AFC Champions League, regardless of their results in the A-League or the Australia Cup. They also do not participate in the OFC Champions League, as New Zealand is represented by clubs from its football league, the New Zealand Football Championship. Wellington Phoenix are the only extant professional football team in New Zealand; the New Zealand Football Championship is amateur. The reserve team of Wellington Phoenix began play in the NZ Championship in 2014–15, and have featured in every season since.

Satellite teams in Singapore 

Besides DPMM FC, a number of "foreign" teams have also played in the S.League. These clubs, while playing their home games in Singapore, are satellite teams of foreign clubs:

 Albirex Niigata Singapore FC (a satellite team of Albirex Niigata, a top-level professional club in Japan's J. League)
 Beijing Guoan Talent Singapore FC (a satellite team of Beijing Guoan F.C., a top-level professional club in China's Super League)
 Dalian Shide Siwu FC (a satellite team of Dalian Haichang, a top-level professional club in China's Super League)
 Liaoning Guangyuan FC (a satellite team of Liaoning FC, a top-level professional club in China's Super League)

As of 2016, only Albirex Niigata Singapore FC play in the S.League. The foreign teams are not allowed to represent Singapore in AFC club competitions such as the AFC Champions League and the AFC Cup.

In recent years, foreign clubs from other countries have also been invited to participate in the Singapore Cup.

References 

Lists of sports clubs